Kownia is a Polish coat of arms. It was used by several szlachta families in the times of the Polish–Lithuanian Commonwealth.

History

Blazon

Notable bearers

Notable bearers of this coat of arms include:

See also
 Coat of arms
 Heraldry
 Polish heraldry

Polish coats of arms